Rashid Bakr (born Charles Downs on October 3, 1943 in Chicago, Illinois) is an American free jazz drummer.

Career
During the 1970s, he was active in the New York City loft jazz scene, performing at venues such as Rashied Ali's "Ali's Alley" and Sam Rivers' "Studio Rivbea". He was a member of Ensemble Muntu with Jemeel Moondoc, among others.

In 1976, Bakr performed in a production of Adrienne Kennedy's A Rat's Mass directed by Cecil Taylor at La MaMa Experimental Theatre Club in the East Village of Manhattan. Musicians Jimmy Lyons, Andy Bey, Karen Borca, David S. Ware, and Raphe Malik also performed in the production. Taylor's production combined the original script with a chorus of orchestrated voices used as instruments. Bakr continued to perform with Taylor into the 1980s, appearing on his albums The Eighth and Winged Serpent (Sliding Quadrants).

Bakr is a member of Other Dimensions in Music with Roy Campbell, Daniel Carter, and William Parker.

Discography

As leader or co-leader
 Seeing New York From the Ear (Cadence, 1996) with Frode Gjerstad and William Parker
 Cooler Suite (GROB, 2003) with Thomas Borgmann, Peter Brötzmann, and William Parker

With the Flow Trio (Louis Belogenis, Joe Morris, Bakr listed as Charles Downs)
 Rejuvenation (ESP-Disk, 2009) 
 Set Theory: Live At The Stone (Ayler Records, 2011)
 Winter Garden (ESP-Disk, 2021) with Joe McPhee

As sideman

With Billy Bang
 New York Collage (Anima, 1978)
 Black Man's Blues (NoBusiness, 2011)

With John Bickerton
 Open Music (CIMP, 2000)
 Shadow Boxes (Leo Lab, 2000)

With Arthur Doyle
 Live At the Alterknit (Qbico, 2008)

With Frode Gjerstad
 A Sound Sight (Ayler, 2007)

With Sabir Mateen
 The Sabir Mateen Jubilee Ensemble (Not Two, 2013)

With Joe McPhee
 Ticonderoga (Clean Feed, 2015)

With Jemeel Moondoc
 First Feeding (Muntu, 1977)
 The Evening of the Blue Men (Muntu, 1979)
 New York Live! (Cadence Jazz, 1981)
 The Intrepid Live in Poland (Poljazz, 1981)

With Ras Moshe
 Transcendence (KMB, 2007)

With Other Dimensions in Music
 Other Dimensions In Music (Silkheart, 1990)
 Now! (AUM Fidelity, 1998)
 Time Is of the Essence Is Beyond Time (AUM Fidelity, 2000)
 Kaiso Stories (Silkheart, 2011)

With William Parker
 Centering. Unreleased Early Recordings 1976–1987 (NoBusiness, 2012)

With Jamie Saft
 Atlas (Veal, 2020)
 Mountains (Veal, 2020)

With Glenn Spearman
 First and Last (Eremite, 1999)

With Cecil Taylor
 The Eighth (Hat Hut, 1986)
 Winged Serpent (Sliding Quadrants) (Soul Note, 1985)
 Always a Pleasure (FMP, 1996)

References

External links
 
Bakr's page on La MaMa Archives Digital Collections

Free jazz drummers
Living people
1943 births
CIMP artists
American session musicians
American jazz drummers
20th-century American drummers
American male drummers
20th-century American male musicians
American male jazz musicians
21st-century American drummers
Other Dimensions In Music members
21st-century American male musicians